Nightmare 2003-2005 is Nightmare's re-release of their earlier works under Nippon Crown. This collection includes a DVD with their past promotional videos.

Track listing

References

Nightmare (Japanese band) albums
2008 compilation albums
2008 video albums
Music video compilation albums